Basilan may refer to:
                  
Places
 Basilan, officially Province of Basilan, an island province in the Philippines
 Basilan National Park
 Basilan State College
 Basilan Strait
Other
 Legislative district of Basilan
 USS Basilan (AG-68), an auxiliary ship acquired by the U.S. Navy during World War II